A non-binding constitutional referendum was held in Iceland on 20 October 2012. As a part of the 2010–2013 constitutional reform, and upon recommendation by the Constitutional Assembly, voters were asked whether they approved of six proposals included in a new draft constitution of Iceland. All six questions were approved by voters. The passing of Question 3 regarding the inclusion of a national church in the constitution was the only provision that went against the Constitutional Assembly's recommendations.

Questions
The referendum consisted of six questions:

 Do you wish the Constitution Council's proposals to form the basis of a new draft Constitution?
 In the new Constitution, do you want natural resources that are not privately owned to be declared national property?
 Would you like to see provisions in the new Constitution on an established (national) church in Iceland?
 Would you like to see a provision in the new Constitution authorising the election of particular individuals to the Althing more than is the case at present?
 Would you like to see a provision in the new Constitution giving equal weight to votes cast in all parts of the country?
 Would you like to see a provision in the new Constitution stating that a certain proportion of the electorate is able to demand that issues are put to a referendum?

Results

References

External links
Questions on the ballot - discussion and clarification (English)
General information about the Constitutional Council (English)
Voters in Iceland back new constitution, more resource control. Reuters (retrieved 23 May 2015).

2012 referendums
2012
2012 in Iceland
Constitution of Iceland
October 2012 events in Europe